This is the list of current heads of states with limited recognition.

The criteria for inclusion in this list are the same as in List of states with limited recognition—that is, a polity must claim sovereignty, lack recognition from at least one UN member state, and either:

 satisfy the declarative theory of statehood, or
 be recognised as a state by at least one UN member state.

List
Italics denotes an acting head of state

See also
 List of current state leaders by date of assumption of office

Notes

References